
Georg Christoph Albrecht Ebner (11 August 1784, Ludwigsburg - 17 April 1863, Stuttgart) was a German publisher.

Biography 
His father, was an art publisher. Shortly after, he married Wilhelmine Kurz (1789–1865), with whom he had twelve children. He mainly published illustrated books at first, including views of Württemberg and Lake Constance, as well as several books on various horse breeds.

He finally created his own lithographic firm. It was there that the landscape painter and lithographer, Eberhard Emminger, served his apprenticeship in 1822, and the future publisher, worked from 1828 to 1831. After purchasing a shop that sold musical scores, he renamed his company "G. Ebnersche Kunst- und Musikalienhandlung" (art and music seller). In 1833, he was one of the founders of the Allgemeinen Rentenanstalt, the first pension insurance company in Germany (still in business as the ).

Shortly before his fiftieth wedding anniversary, he was killed during construction work at his home. Stepping on a loose board, he fell two floors and was knocked unconscious. He died four hours later.

References

Further reading 
 Udo Dickenberger, Waltraud und Friedrich Pfäfflin, Der Stuttgarter Hoppenlau-Friedhof als literarisches Denkmal, Marbach am Neckar 1992, S. 248 f.

External links 

 
 

1784 births
1863 deaths
German publishers (people)
German booksellers
People from Ludwigsburg
Accidental deaths in Germany
Accidental deaths from falls